Copelatus villiersi is a species of diving beetle. It is part of the subfamily Copelatinae in the family Dytiscidae. It was described by Félix Guignot in 1950.

References

villiersi
Beetles described in 1950